The Redcliffe-Maud Report (Cmnd. 4040) was published in 1969 by the Royal Commission on Local Government in England, under the chairmanship of Lord Redcliffe-Maud. Although the commission's proposals were broadly accepted by the Labour government, they were set aside by the Conservative government elected in 1970.

Terms of reference and membership
The commission was appointed on 7 June 1966, with the following terms of reference:
"....to consider the structure of Local Government in England, outside Greater London, in relation to its existing functions; and to make recommendations for authorities and boundaries, and for functions and their division, having regard to the size and character of areas in which these can be most effectively exercised and the need to sustain a viable system of local democracy; and to report."

The members of the commission were Redcliffe-Maud (chairman), John Eveleigh Bolton (vice-chairman), Derek Senior, Sir James William Francis Hill, Victor Grayson Hardie Feather, Arthur Hedley Marshall, Peter Mursell, John Laurence Longland, Reginald Charles Wallis, Thomas Dan Smith and Dame Evelyn Adelaide Sharp.

Report findings

Broadly the report recommended the abolition of all existing county, county borough, borough, urban district and rural district councils, which had been created at the end of the 19th century, and replacing them with new unitary authorities. These new unitary authorities were largely based on major towns, which acted as regional employment, commercial, social and recreational centres and took into account local transport infrastructure and travel patterns.

There were to be 58 new unitary authorities and three metropolitan areas (Merseyside; South East Lancashire/North East Cheshire or 'Selnec'; and West Midlands), which were to be sub-divided into lower tier metropolitan districts.  These new authorities, along with Greater London, were to be grouped into eight provinces, each with its own provincial council.

Division of functions
In arriving at their recommendations, the commissioners were guided by a number of principles which they had themselves devised. These included:
Town and country are interdependent, therefore the separate administration of urban areas and their rural hinterlands should cease.
"Physical environment services" should be in the hands of a single authority. Examples of these services included planning and transport. To provide these wide area services, the authority should have boundaries that reflected geographical patterns of population and movement and provided a coherent area of administration.
"Personal services" should likewise be administered by a single council. These included education, social services, health and housing. The optimum population range over which to provide these services was 250,000 to 1,000,000.
Wherever possible, both types of services should be in the hands of a single unitary authority.
Areas for the new authorities should be capable of being effectively and democratically administered by a single council.

Accordingly, the different categories of council would have the following powers and responsibilities:

Provincial councils: Drawing up of strategic development plans. They were to take over the functions of the existing regional economic planning councils.
Unitary area councils: Both physical environment and personal services
Metropolitan area councils: Planning, transport and general housing policy.
Metropolitan district councils: Education and personal social services.

Local councils
It had originally been envisaged that parish councils should also be abolished, but the Secretary of the National Association of Parish Councils (NACP), Charles Arnold-Baker, convinced the commission that they should be preserved.

Derek Senior's memorandum of dissent
The commission was nearly unanimous, with some reservations as to the exact geographic details.  One member of the commission, Derek Senior, dissented entirely from the proposals, and put forward his own in a memorandum of dissent (Cmnd. 4040-I), which was slightly larger than the report itself.  He would have preferred a two-tier system, with 35 city-regions of varying size, along with 148 districts.  These were to be further grouped into five provinces.  At a lower level, there would be 'common councils', roughly equivalent to civil parish councils, which would also cover communities within large towns; special arrangements were to be made for the area surrounding Berwick-upon-Tweed.  These proposals effectively ignored traditional boundaries, to a much greater extent than the Report itself did.

Reaction
Immediately after the report was published, Prime Minister Harold Wilson said that he accepted the recommendations "in principle" and committed the government to "press ahead quickly" on the legislation necessary to implement it, later clarifying that legislation would probably follow in the 1970–71 or 1971–72 parliamentary session. The Labour Party Government issued a white paper entitled "Reform of Local Government in England" (Cmnd 4276) in February 1970, broadly accepting the recommendations of the report. The Government had however added two new metropolitan areas: West Yorkshire (with the five Bradford/Leeds/Halifax/Huddersfield/Mid-Yorkshire unitaries as districts), and South Hampshire based on the Southampton and Portsmouth unitaries, with the Isle of Wight being a separate district.

Observers felt that the Conservative Party, then in opposition, had no urgency in defining their position. The shadow spokesman Peter Walker did not commit himself but instead held a series of regional conferences to ascertain party grassroots opinion. Reports suggested these conferences were overwhelmingly hostile and the Conservative Party conference in 1969 passed a highly critical motion, while suggesting that some reform of local government was supported. Walker decided that a future Conservative government could not implement Redcliffe-Maud, but refused to disown the report completely.

The Rural District Councils Association was immediately opposed to the proposals which would see their members subsumed in much larger authorities. They started a national campaign with the slogan "Don't Vote for R.E. Mote" (with Mr R.E. Mote depicted as an insensitive bureaucrat), distributing material to all their members. The slogan was used on postal franking from the affected authorities. Swale Rural District Council was forced to opt out of the campaign due to the similarity of "R.E. Mote" with the local Conservative prospective parliamentary candidate R.D. Moate. By coincidence, Moate had moved the motion opposing Redcliffe-Maud at the Conservative Party conference.

New government
When the Conservatives won the 1970 general election, they did so on a manifesto committed to a two-tier system in local government. In 1971 a further white paper entitled "Local Government in England: Government Proposals for Reorganisation" (Cmnd 4584) announced its intentions, which ultimately led to the 1974 re-organisation.  Although the general plan of the report was abandoned, many of the specific innovations were carried over, such as the plan to associate Slough with Berkshire, and Bournemouth with Dorset.

Aftermath
In the actual 1974 re-organisation, the three metropolitan areas became metropolitan counties, though their area was greatly reduced.  A further three were added, covering the Leeds/Bradford area (West Yorkshire), the Sheffield/Rotherham area (South Yorkshire) and the Tyneside area (Tyne and Wear).  The concept of authorities based around Bristol (Avon), and Teesside (Cleveland) was also retained.  In most areas though, the 1974 system was far more conservative and retained more traditional boundaries.

The situation of wholly two-tier government did not last.  The county councils for the metropolitan counties were abolished in 1986 by Margaret Thatcher's government, making the metropolitan boroughs effectively into unitary authorities.  A further set of reforms in the 1990s led to the re-establishment of many old county boroughs as unitary authorities, along with other areas.

In 2004 the Government put forward a proposal to introduce directly-elected regional assemblies in the three regions of Northern England, should referendums produce a 'yes' vote (in the event the first region voted 'no' overwhelmingly, and the other referendums were abandoned).  The regional boundaries proposed were very similar to the three northern Redcliffe-Maud provinces.  Associated with this reform would have been a move to wholly unitary local government in the affected regions.  In the area of Cumbria and Lancashire, the proposals bore a striking resemblance to the ones in the Report.

Proposed unitary and metropolitan areas

Greater London was outside the scope of the report, having been reorganised in 1965 under the London Government Act 1963.

References
Notes

Bibliography

Geography of England
History of local government in England
British Royal Commissions
1960s in the United Kingdom
1966 establishments in England